Timycha of Sparta (early 4th century BC), along with her husband Myllias of Croton (Μυλλίας Κροτωνιάτης), was a member of a group of Pythagorean pilgrims, who were attacked by Syracusian soldiers on their way to Metapontum, because they had rejected the friendship of the tyrant Dionysius the Elder. Although they had the option of running through a field of beans to escape, they would not, as this was a taboo to them. Instead they fought and died, with the exception of the pregnant Timycha and her husband, who were captured. Dionysius questioned her as to the reason for this taboo, but she refused to answer. Instead, she bit off her tongue and spat it at his feet in a gesture of defiance.

References

Philostorgius: Church History, Philip R. Amidon. Page 174.   (2007)

Classical Greek philosophers
Ancient Greek women philosophers
4th-century BC Greek people
4th-century BC Greek women
4th-century BC philosophers
Pythagoreans of Magna Graecia
Ancient Syracuse
Spartan women in ancient warfare
Year of birth unknown
Year of death unknown